Margot Drake (1899–1948) was an English stage and film actress. During the silent era she appeared in eight British films including The Wonderful Year.

Selected filmography
 A Bachelor Husband (1920)
 The Breed of the Treshams (1920)
 The Headmaster (1921)
 The Wonderful Year (1921)
 The Street of Adventure (1921)

References

Bibliography
 Low, Rachael. History of the British Film, 1918-1929. George Allen & Unwin, 1971.

External links

1899 births
1948 deaths
English film actresses
English silent film actresses
20th-century English actresses
Actresses from London